Roland Rudolf (born August 6, 1985) is a Hungarian swimmer, who specialized in backstroke events. He is an eight-time All-American swimmer, a multiple-time Hungarian titleholder in the age groups (1997–2004), and a two-time finalist at the 2002 European Junior Swimming Championships in Linz, Austria. Rudolf is also a member of the swimming team for the Florida Gators, and an economics graduate at the University of Florida in Gainesville, Florida.

Rudolf competed for Hungary in a backstroke double at the 2008 Summer Olympics in Beijing. Leading up to the Games, he posted a lifetime tech-suit best of 1:59.00 (200 m backstroke) to eclipse the FINA A-standard (1:59.72) by 0.72 of a second at the USA Swimming Grand Prix in Columbus, Ohio. On the second night of the Games, Rudolf obtained a fifth spot and thirty-fifth overall in heat 2 of the 100 m backstroke by one tenth of a second (0.10) behind Iceland's Örn Arnarson in 56.25. In his second event, 200 m backstroke, Rudolf rounded out the field of eight swimmers to last place in heat six with 1:59.44, just four tenths of a second (0.4) outside his entry standard and more than three seconds behind college teammate and eventual Olympic champion Ryan Lochte of the United States. Rudolf missed out the semifinals by a half-second deficit (0.50), as he shared a nineteenth-place tie with Austria's Sebastian Stoss in the prelims.

References

External links
Player Bio – Florida Gators
NBC Olympics Profile

1985 births
Living people
Hungarian male swimmers
Olympic swimmers of Hungary
Swimmers at the 2008 Summer Olympics
Male backstroke swimmers
Swimmers from Budapest
Florida Gators men's swimmers
20th-century Hungarian people
21st-century Hungarian people